Leandro Rodrigues Bernardes, aka Leandro Esquerdinha (born Cuiabá-MT 18 November 1985) is a Brazilian-born Russian futsal player who currently plays for Barcelona and the Russia national team.

Esquerdinha previously played for Goias (Brazil), Minas (Brazil), Cartagena Futsal (Spain), Segovia Futsal (Spain), ElPozo Murcia FS (Spain). As of 12.16.2014 he held 91 games and scored 122 goals for Dina Moscow. His 50th game was played on March 22, 2014 in Troitsk in the XXII Championship of Russia against “Norilsk Nickel”. His 50th goal was scored on the 23 of November 2014 in Troitsk in the Russian Championship XXII in a game against “Sibiryak”.

Achievements 
 Spanish Cup and Supercup Winner (1): 2009/10
 Russian Futsal Championship Winner (1): 2013/14
 UEFA Futsal Champions League Winner (1): 2019–20
 UEFA Futsal Champions League third place: 2018–19

Personal 
 The best scorer of the Spanish Championship: 2007;
 The best player in the Spanish Championship: 2011;
 The best forward of the regular Spanish Championship: 2012;

For three seasons of 2010-2012 Esquerdinha scored in the Championship of Spain more than hundred goals.

References

External links 
Leandro Esquerdinha Futsal Russia
AMFR profile

1985 births
Living people
MFK Dina Moskva players
ElPozo Murcia FS players
FC Barcelona Futsal players
Brazilian men's futsal players
Russian men's futsal players
Brazilian expatriate sportspeople in Spain